4Kids TV (often stylized as 4K!DSTV and formerly known as FoxBox from September 14, 2002 to January 15, 2005) was an American television programming block and Internet-based video on demand children's network operated by 4Kids Entertainment. It originated as a weekly block on Saturday mornings on the Fox network, which was created out of a four-year agreement reached on January 22, 2002, between 4Kids Entertainment and Fox to lease the five-hour Saturday morning time slot occupied by the network's existing children's program block, Fox Kids. It was targeted at children aged 7–11. The 4Kids TV block was part of the Fox network schedule, although it was syndicated to other broadcast television stations in certain markets where a Fox affiliate declined to air it.

History
The block aired a preview special on September 1, 2002, and was formally launched on September 14, 2002, under the name "FoxBox," a joint venture between the Fox Broadcasting Company and 4Kids Entertainment, replacing Fox Kids, which the network announced it would discontinue as a result of the 2001 purchase of Fox Family Worldwide by The Walt Disney Company (which resulted in much of the content featured on the block moving to Disney's networks and blocks). The block was rebranded as 4Kids TV on January 22, 2005. 4Kids Entertainment was fully responsible for the content of the block and collected all of the advertising revenue accrued from it. However, Fox's standards and practices department still handled content approval and responsibility of editing the series to meet FCC broadcast standards.

The programming block aired on Saturday mornings in most areas of the United States, though some stations carried it on Sundays (often due to scheduling conflicts resulting from the block airing on stations affiliated with other minor networks that had their own older children's anime program blocks which competed with FoxBox/4Kids TV, including the Kids' WB on The WB and later The CW, and for its first year, the Disney's One Too block on UPN). On October 2, 2007, 4Kids Entertainment announced it would program a competing Saturday morning lineup for The CW, the new block, The CW4Kids (later renamed Toonzai, with the original name becoming a secondary brand), premiered on May 24, 2008, replacing the Kids' WB programming block, which had been carried over to The CW from one of its predecessors, The WB, when it launched on September 23, 2006. The block was renamed as Toonzai on August 14, 2010, and continued to air until it ended August 18, 2012, being replaced by Vortexx a week later and the block continued to air until it ended on September 27, 2014.

On November 10, 2008, 4Kids Entertainment announced that 4Kids TV would conclude at the end of the year due to intervening conflicts between Fox and 4Kids, as the latter company had not paid the network for the time lease for some time, while the network was unable to maintain the guaranteed 90% clearance for the block due to affiliate refusals and an inability to secure secondary affiliates to carry the programming in markets where the Fox station denied clearance for the block. 4Kids TV ended on December 27, 2008. Fox announced that the four-hour time period would no longer be used for children's programming, owing that it was no longer viable due to the insurmountable competition from children's cable channels (such as Nickelodeon, Cartoon Network, and Disney Channel). On January 3, 2009, the network gave two hours of the programming time that the 4Kids TV block occupied back to its affiliates, while the other two hours would be retained by the network for a paid programming block titled Weekend Marketplace, which replaced 4Kids TV on January 3, 2009. The 4KidsTV logo now only exists as the closing logo for 4Kids Entertainment for shows produced by the company distributed outside of the United States (particularly those made before the 2012 auction of most of 4Kids' assets to Saban Brands).

Fox would reverse course and indirectly resume airing children's programming for the first time since 4Kids TV ended through an agreement announced on December 17, 2013, when it signed a deal with Steve Rotfeld Productions to launch Xploration Station, a two-hour block of live-action educational programs focused on the STEM fields, which debuted on September 13, 2014. As the block accounts for two of the three weekly hours of educational programming required by the Federal Communications Commission's Children's Television Act, the Fox affiliates that opted against airing 4Kids TV, Fox Kids, or Weekend Marketplace (including those owned by the network that were acquired through its 1996 merger with New World Communications and those acquired through that deal that were owned by Tribune Broadcasting, now Nexstar Media Group) elected to run Xploration Station as it is an E/I-compliant lineup syndicated primarily to the network's affiliates, relieving them of taking on the full burden of purchasing educational programming aimed at children from the syndication market (although some Fox stations, including those owned by the Sinclair Broadcast Group—the vast majority of its stations had carried Fox's previous children's blocks, decided to decline the block anyway due to existing commitments to syndicated programs compliant with Children's Television Act recommendations).

As of 2022, some former 4Kids TV shows such as Yu-Gi-Oh! and Sonic X are made available to stream on the free ad-supported Tubi streaming service, which Fox acquired in April 2020. Sonic X is also available on Netflix as of December 2019, though only seasons 1 and 2. And also, Teenage Mutant Ninja Turtles is made available to stream on both the free ad-supported Pluto TV and subscription-based Paramount+ streaming services following that property's 2009 acquisition by Nickelodeon.

Programming

Former programming

Original programming

Acquired programming

Short-form programming

4KidsTV.com

Online network
4Kids launched an online video player on its website on September 8, 2007, and gradually added full-length episodes as well as additional video clips and online-exclusive content.

Relationship with Fox and broadcast ambiguities
The block had a somewhat infrequent relationship to the Fox network. The programming was produced for Fox and offered to the network's owned-and-operated stations and affiliates first, so the Fox station in any given area had the right of first refusal. In the event that a Fox affiliate or in some cases, an O&O of the network—opted not to carry 4Kids TV, the block then became available for the local broadcast rights to be acquired by another television station. In fact, it was due in part to these carriage ambiguities that 4Kids dissolved the block in 2008, as they had been promised clearance on at least 90% of Fox's stations.

Most of Fox's owned-and-operated stations opted to carry 4Kids TV (these were mainly stations that had been owned by the network since Fox launched in October 1986 or were Fox charter affiliates that Fox Television Stations had acquired since that point). However dating back to the existence of the Fox Kids block, the twelve stations that Fox acquired from New World Communications in 1996 (and had earlier affiliated with the network through a 1994 multi-station affiliation deal—which prior to then, had been affiliated with ABC, NBC, or CBS) generally did not air 4Kids TV. In some of the New World markets, 4Kids was not carried on any station. In a majority of these markets, an independent station carried the block; in others, it was carried by either a WB or UPN affiliate, and later a MyNetworkTV or CW affiliate. The only exception was in St. Louis, Missouri, where Fox O&O (now affiliate) KTVI carried the block (although it aired 4Kids TV two hours earlier than the network's recommended scheduling for the block, beginning at 5:00 a.m., due to the station's Saturday morning newscast).

Some of 4Kids TV's programming (such as Winx Club, The Adrenaline Project, Magical DoReMi, Stargate Infinity, reruns of Back to the Future: the Animated Series, and Cubix) met the criteria to be considered educational and informational under the requirements defined by the Children's Television Act, and counted toward the three-hour-per-week mandatory educational children's programming quotas outlined by the Federal Communications Commission. Outside of Fox, 4Kids TV's programming aired reruns on The WB every Sunday morning after a new episode aired on Saturday on Fox, and new episodes on The WB's children block Kids' WB.

Markets where 4Kids TV did not run

Markets where 4Kids TV ran on a MyNetworkTV affiliate

Markets where 4Kids TV ran on a CW affiliate
Note: These CW affiliates ran 4Kids TV on Sundays, due to their obligation to carry The CW4Kids Saturday block (or, as in the case of Atlanta CW affiliate WUPA, which ran The CW4Kids on Sundays because of other programming airing on Saturdays).

Markets where 4Kids TV ran on an independent station

See also

 4Licensing Corporation – formerly known as 4Kids Entertainment.
 Toonzai – children's program block produced by 4Kids for The CW from May 24, 2008 to August 18, 2012.

Notes

References

External links
 Fox
 IMDb page for "The Fight for the Fox Box": a half-hour television special featuring multiple crossovers from various FoxBox shows.

 
4Kids Entertainment
Television channels and stations disestablished in 2008
Television channels and stations established in 2002
Television programming blocks in the United States
Windows games